Yang Tzu-pao (born 8 August 1963) is a Taiwanese politician and diplomat. He was the Deputy Minister of Culture in 2016-2018 and incumbent Representative to Ireland since 2018.

Early life
Yang was born in Hualien County in 1963. He obtained his bachelor's degree in agriculture engineering in 1986 and master's degree in civil engineering in 1989 from National Taiwan University. He then obtained his doctoral degree in engineering from École Nationale des Ponts et Chaussées in France in 1996.

Early careers
Upon his doctoral degree education completion, Yang was invited as project manager to participate in the feasibility study of the interoceanic railway in Nigaragua, Honduras, Guatemala and El Salvador. After working there for three months, Yang joined a transportation planning company THI Consultants as chief engineer.

Political careers
In 1999, Yang was invited by Hsinchu City Mayor James Tsai to be his deputy.

See also
 Culture of Taiwan

References

Living people
1963 births
Deputy mayors of Hsinchu
Politicians of the Republic of China on Taiwan from Hualien County
Representatives of Taiwan to France
Representatives of Taiwan to Ireland
Taiwanese Ministers of Foreign Affairs
Taiwanese civil engineers